Race station, sometimes listed as Race Street, is a light rail station operated by Santa Clara Valley Transportation Authority (VTA).  The station consists of a single platform with a single trackway.  Trains from both directions arrive on the same track.  Race station is served by the Green Line of the VTA Light Rail system.

Location
Race station is located near the intersection of Race Street and Parkmoor Avenue.

History
Race station was built as part of the Vasona Light Rail extension project.  This project extended VTA light rail service from the intersection of Woz Way and West San Carlos Street in San Jose in a southwesterly direction to the Winchester station in western Campbell.

The official opening date for this station was October 1, 2005.

The construction of this station and the rest of the Vasona Light Rail extension was part of the 1996 Measure B Transportation Improvement Program.  Santa Clara County voters approved the Measure B project in 1996 along with a half-percent sales tax increase.  The Vasona Light Rail extension was funded mostly by the resulting sales tax revenues with additional money coming from federal and state funding, grants, VTA bond revenues, and municipal contributions.

Platforms and tracks

References

External links

Santa Clara Valley Transportation Authority light rail stations
Railway stations in San Jose, California
Railway stations in the United States opened in 2005
2005 establishments in California